Incilius bocourti (formerly Bufo bocourti; common name Bocourt's toad) is a species of toad in the family Bufonidae. It is found in southwestern Guatemala and in Chiapas in the adjacent Mexico. Its phylogenetic position is uncertain; it might not to belong to this genus, being the sister taxon of Anaxyrus instead. It is named after Marie Firmin Bocourt, a French zoologist and artist.

Its natural habitats are coniferous highlands, but it can also occur heavily disturbed, treeless areas. Breeding takes place in temporary ponds. There are no major threats to it.

References

bocourti
Amphibians of Guatemala
Amphibians of Mexico
Amphibians described in 1877
Taxonomy articles created by Polbot